The 1991 Paris–Roubaix was the 89th running of the Paris–Roubaix single-day cycling race.

Results

References

1991
April 1991 sports events in Europe
1991 in road cycling
1991 in French sport
1991 UCI Road World Cup